Andrew Hussie (born August 25, 1979) is an American author and artist. He is best known as the creator of Homestuck, a multimedia webcomic presented in the style of a text-based graphical adventure game, as well as other works in a similar style that were hosted on his website MS Paint Adventures.

Career

Early works 
Andrew Hussie began posting Jailbreak in 2006. This was posted on a discussion forum and took the appearance of a text-based graphical adventure game. Hussie would post simple drawings with text, and other forum users suggesting commands for the game that Hussie would quickly respond to with a rapidly drawn image. In 2007, Hussie created the website MS Paint Adventures to host his comics; its first three works were Jailbreak, Bard Quest, and Problem Sleuth. Problem Sleuth would run for over 1,600 pages produced over one year, and during this time Hussie was creating up to 10 pages a day.

Homestuck 

Hussie produced the multimedia webcomic Homestuck, which started in April 2009 and ended in April 2016. It tells the story of a group of four kids who play a computer game called Sburb and inadvertently cause the end of the world. Homestuck included images, text, Flash animations, and interactive elements. Homestuck, like Hussie's previous works, started with reader-submitted commands for the characters to follow, but Hussie moved away from this style because, he said, the fan input method had grown "too unwieldy and made it difficult... to tell a coherent story." While Hussie now controlled the main plot of the story and the characters' actions, he said that he still "visit[ed] fan blogs and forums" to figure out small things to add into Homestuck.

Initially, Hussie updated Homestuck regularly, usually about three times a week. However, there were often long gaps between updates, including a pause of over a year starting in 2013, and another long pause starting in 2015. At one point, Hussie described working on Homestuck as less like a full-time job and more like an "all-encompassing lifestyle," saying that the time he spends on the work occupied something just short of all of his waking hours.

Vice noted that Homestuck was "wildly popular during its seven-year run"; as of 2011 it was receiving an average of 600,000 unique visitors each day and as of 2015 it was receiving upwards of 1 million unique visitors a day. Hussie said, "The bigger the fandom got, the more controversial everything was... Practically everything that happened was a serious point of contention—a reason to argue, discuss, to generate pages and pages of heated dissertation on what everything means, and why certain things are good or bad. All of this was supposed to be part of the experience. It was part of the cat-and-mouse game between the author and reader."

By the end of its run, the entire work contained over 800,000 words across at least 8,000 pages. Fans contributed to the final work in a number of ways, including producing all of the music. Over a hundred musicians and artists contributed to the final work, with Hussie commissioning artists for important updates. By 2011 there were eight albums of Homestuck music.

Vice magazine noted that Homestuck "became infamous for its sprawling, overly complicated, semi-improvised, deeply self-referential plot, driven partly by reader input and speculation, as well as the incredible and sometimes terrifying vigor of its fandom." PBS's Ideas Channel compared Homestuck to Ulysses because of the complex and densely worded storytelling the series often utilizes.

Sequels and spinoffs of Homestuck 
The Homestuck Epilogues was a text-only work released in April 2019. It consisted of 190,000 words in a nonlinear novel that was co-written by Hussie and four other creators; Cephied_Variable, ctset, Lalo Hunt, and Aysha U. Farah.

A sequel to Homestuck, titled Homestuck^2: Beyond Canon, began in late 2019. While the story was outlined by Hussie, it was to be written by a team of writers. According to its website, it was updated regularly for about a year "until it was paused indefinitely," with the rest of the comic to be released when it was completed.

A videogame based on Homestuck, called Hiveswap, was first announced in 2012 and raised over $US2.4 million through a Kickstarter. Initially, its release date was given as 2014, but had a troubled development, including switching from 3D to 2D years after development started. It was later broken up into four episodes: the first episode of Hiveswap was released in 2017 and its second episode was released in 2020. Two other videogames were based on Homestuck, Hiveswap Friendsim and Pesterquest.

Hussie has been a managing member of What Pumpkin, LLC. According to What Pumpkin's website, Hussie officially left What Pumpkin in early 2020 to work on projects unrelated to Homestuck. According to the notice, Hussie still retains ownership of the Homestuck intellectual property, but has discontinued all creative involvement in any future Homestuck projects.

Other works 
Hussie produced a visual novel called Psycholonials. It was first announced in December 2020, and its final episode was released in April 2021. Hussie has described it as a commentary on American politics and on the uncomfortable cult-like atmosphere surrounding the Homestuck fandom.

Personal life 

Andrew Hussie was born on August 25, 1979. Hussie graduated from Temple University with a degree in computer science. He has said that he has "moved well over fifty times". As of 2010 he was living in western Massachusetts.

Works 
Videos
 Andrew Hussie, with Jan Van dem Hemel, created parody edits of Star Trek: The Next Generation in the late 2000s.
 Andrew worked with his brother to make a video series about an eccentric Bigfoot researcher, called Barty's Brew-Ha-Ha (2006 to 2011)

Webcomics by Andrew Hussie
 Team Special Olympics
 Jailbreak
 Bard Quest (June 12, 2007, to July 6, 2007)
 Problem Sleuth (March 10, 2008, to April 7, 2009)
 Homestuck (April 13, 2009, to April 13, 2016)
 Sweet Bro and Hella Jeff
 The Homestuck Epilogues (April 13, 2019, to April 20, 2019)
 Homestuck^2: Beyond Canon (September 25, 2019, to present, but "paused indefinitely")

Published books
 Whistles, Book One (The Starlight Calliope) (out of print, available online) 
 Problem Sleuth (Five volumes, which cover all 22 chapters)
 Volume One: Compensation, Adequate 
 Volume Two: This is Complete BS 
 Volume Three: Suitor to the Sodajerk's Confidante 
 Volume Four: Black Liquid Sorrow 
 Volume Five: Sepulchritude 
 Homestuck
 By TopatoCo (three volumes, which cover Acts 1, 2, and 3, respectively)
 Volume One 
 Volume Two 
 Volume Three 
 By Viz Media
 Book 1: Act 1 & Act 2 
 Book 2: Act 3 & Intermission 
 Book 3: Act 4 
 Book 4: Act 5 Act 1 
 Book 5: Act 5 Act 2 Part 1 
 Book 6: Act 5 Act 2 Part 2 
 The Homestuck Epilogues: Volume Meat / Volume Candy (2020) 
 Sweet Bro and Hella Jeff 

Video game projects
 Hiveswap
 Namco High (2013)
 Hiveswap Friendsim (2018)
 Pesterquest (2019)
 Psycholonials (2021)

References

External links 
 

American webcomic creators
Living people
1979 births
Place of birth missing (living people)
Temple University alumni
MS Paint Adventures
Electronic literature writers